Soumaila is a given name. Notable people with the name include:

 Soumaïla Cissé (born 1949), Malian politician
 Soumaila Coulibaly (born 1978), Malian footballer
 Soumaila Diakite (born 1984), Malian footballer
 Soumaila Samake (born 1978), Malian basketball player
 Soumaila Tassembedo (born 1983), Burkinabé footballer